Thomas Heine is a Marshallese politician and government minister. He has had a term as Minister of Transportation and Communications, and as of 2012 he was Minister of Justice. In 2012 he was elected to the Board of Directors of the Marshall Islands Legal Services Corporation, and as of 2014 he was Chairman of the Central Pacific Shipping Commission.

References

Communication ministers of the Marshall Islands
Justice ministers of the Marshall Islands
Transport ministers of the Marshall Islands
Marshallese politicians
Living people
Year of birth missing (living people)